The Ballarat V/Line rail service is a regional passenger rail service operated by V/Line in Victoria, Australia. It serves passengers between state capital Melbourne and the regional city of Ballarat. Beyond Ballarat, it changes name to the Ararat railway line and the Maryborough railway line.

The Ballarat service is the second busiest service in Victoria (behind Geelong), carrying 3.17 million passengers in the 12 months ended 30 June 2014.

History

V/Line once operated services to Horsham and Dimboola. Several rail stations such as Gordon and Warrenheip were closed in October 1981 as part of the New Deal timetable.  All services beyond Ballarat were withdrawn on 27 May 1994, and in 1995 the One Nation Program regauged the line beyond Ararat. The broad-gauge line between Ballarat and Ararat was closed to all traffic, with the broad-gauge passenger service from Ballarat to Ararat not reinstated until 2004 under the Linking Victoria program.

In November 2004, Premier of Victoria Steve Bracks announced that the line would be renamed the Eureka Line to mark the 150th anniversary of the Eureka uprising. Due to take effect from late 2005 at the same time as the renaming of Spencer Street station to Southern Cross. The renaming was criticised by groups such as the Public Transport Users Association, and was never carried out.

On 9 May 2009, Wendouree station to the west of Ballarat station opened.

In December 2008, as part of the Victorian Transport Plan, the State Government announced passenger rail services to Maryborough would resume with services commencing on 25 July 2010.

By 2009, a total of 48,000 passengers or an average of 1,000 per week were using the line between Ballarat and Ararat.

The Victorian Transport Plan released in December 2008 proposed the progressive upgrade of the Melton line to support future urban development in the corridor. The Regional Fast Rail project to Ballarat has been completed. The construction of the new Caroline Springs railway station (Ravenhall) commenced in August 2015, and has now been completed with the first trains running on 29 January 2017. Another new station was constructed for the new outer suburb of Cobblebank, between the existing Rockbank and Melton station stations, services having commenced on 2 December 2019. The PTV Network Development Plan published in 2013 advocates for the electrification of the line and duplication between Sunshine and Deer Park in order to incorporate it into the electrified metropolitan network, joining the Sunbury line and running via the Metro Tunnel.

The line was formerly constrained by a single bi-directional track section between Caroline Springs railway station and Melton station, having only a small stretch of double track close to Rockbank railway station to facilitate the passing of trains. As part of Ballarat Line Upgrade, the 17 kilometres of single track were duplicated with stabling facilities provided at Melton, as well as Rockbank Station being rebuilt and the construction of a new station at Cobblebank. This was designed to increase reliability and capacity on the line, as well as facilitate electrification.

Construction of the Caroline Springs station, between Deer Park and Rockbank stations, commenced in August 2015 and the station opened on 28 January 2017.

The railway line was upgraded under the Regional Rail Revival project, beginning in early 2018 with major construction completed in 2021. The project, with a budget of $518 million, saw the duplication of 17 kilometres of track between Deer Park West and Melton, upgrade stations at Rockbank, Bacchus Marsh and Ballan, and added a new station at Cobblebank, also adding passing loops at Ballan and Millbrook. It paves the way for the future electrification of the line to Melton. The upgrade has enabled extra services in the morning and afternoon peaks between Melbourne and Ballarat. The new passing loop at Millbrook also allowed the closure of the Bungaree loop to V/line trains.

Services

V/Line operates services every 20 minutes from Southern Cross. Half of these terminate at Melton with every second one continuing through to Wendouree (four of these also extending to Ararat station and two to Maryborough). On weekends services only operate every hour along all the line.

Peak services originating or terminating at Wendouree run express between Bacchus Marsh and Rockbank, Rockbank and Deer Park, Deer Park and Sunshine.
Peak services originating or terminating at Melton run express between Cobblebank and Caroline Springs, Caroline Springs and Ardeer.

Services are operated primarily by V/Line VLocity DMUs, while some peak-hour trains to Bacchus Marsh are operated by Sprinter DMUs and H type carriages hauled by N class locomotives. However, these services are fewer and fewer with more V/locity trains entering service.

V/Line operates passenger trains on the Ararat line to and from Southern Cross station in Melbourne, as well as three road coach services connecting with buses at Ballarat. Roughly half the number of services run towards Maryborough.

Beyond Ballarat the line is classified by V/Line as an Intercity service, so seat reservations are no longer required. Many services run as limited expresses between Ballarat and Melbourne.

On 16 July 2014, V/Line trains between Melbourne and Ararat ceased stopping at North Melbourne as part of the Regional Rail Link project.

In November 2017, the state government announced Cobblebank station would be built between Rockbank and Melton, with a scheduled 2 December 2019 completion date.

Infrastructure
The majority of the line used by the V/Line services is single track, with the exception of:
double track between Melbourne, Sunshine and Melton – the North line is restricted to 130 km/h and the South line to 160 km/h between Sunshine and Caroline Springs, a remnant of Regional Fast Rail's bidirectional, different-speed signalling;
Parwan Loop, between Melton and Bacchus Marsh stations, located before the descent into Bacchus Marsh
a short crossing loop at Rowsley (completed mid 2016)
Bank Box Loop, between Bacchus Marsh and Ballan stations, located atop the Werribee Gorge
Passing loops at Ballan and Millbrook (built between 2018 and 2021 as part Regional Rail Revival)

The V/Line service also previously used the original line via Bungaree as a long crossing loop between Ballan and Ballarat until December 2020. The loop was used in conjunction with the new deviation built in 2005 as part of the Regional Fast Rail project, until the Millbrook passing loop along the deviation was completed as part of Regional Rail Revival.

Line guide
Bold stations are termini, where some train services terminate; italic stations are staffed, at least part-time:

References

External links 

 V/Line
 Discussion on the 2019/2020 upgrade of the Ballarat Line Railpage

V/Line rail services
Transport in Ballarat
Public transport routes in the City of Melbourne (LGA)
Transport in the City of Melton
Transport in the City of Maribyrnong
Transport in the City of Brimbank